London wheel may refer to either of two giant Ferris wheels:

 London Eye (opened to the public in 2000), on the South Bank of the River Thames, in the London Borough of Lambeth
 Great Wheel (operated 1895–1906), at Earls Court, in the Royal Borough of Kensington and Chelsea